First woman may refer to:

 Eve, the first woman in Abrahamic religions
 Aclima, Luluwa or Calmana, in Abrahamic traditions, the first woman born
 Lilith, the first independent woman created and demonic figure in Judaic mythology, supposedly the primordial she-demon and alternatively first wife of Adam
 Lucy, an early female australopithecine that lived 3.2 million years ago
 Wives aboard Noah's Ark, the first women to survive the flood (the wife of Noah and his sons' wives)
 Pandora, first female human in Greek religions
 Shatarupa, first woman in Hinduism religions

See also
 First man or woman (disambiguation)
 List of women's firsts
 Valentina Tereshkova, first woman in space